Behazomaty is a rural commune  in Madagascar. It belongs to the district of Kandreho, which is a part of Betsiboka.  It is situated at 50km East from Kandreho, the capital of the district.
It is situated at the Menavava river.

References

Populated places in Betsiboka